The Poland national men's volleyball team is controlled by the Polish Volleyball Federation, which represents the country in international competitions and friendly matches. Poland is one of the world's strongest teams, they are ranked first in the FIVB world ranking as of 11 September 2022.

History
Poland achieved some of its best results in the 1970s, with gold medals at 1974 World Championship and the 1976 Montreal Summer Olympics. They also won five consecutive silver medals at the European Championship, between 1975 and 1983.

2005–2008 Raúl Lozano

2005
On 17 January 2005 Raúl Lozano was chosen as coach.

On 27 May 2005 he debuted as the coach in official match against Argentina (3–1) – first meeting at 2005 World League. Polish national team won 9 of 12 matches in intercontinental round in Pool C (with Serbia and Montenegro, Greece, Argentina) and achieved promotion to final round in Serbia and Montenegro. They lost just 2 matches with Serbia and Montenegro (2–3, 2–3) and Greece (1–3).

2006
In 2006 polish team won silver medal at World Championship. In final they lost against Brazil.

2009–2010 Daniel Castellani

2009
On 17 January 2009, Daniel Castellani, who had previously led PGE Skra Bełchatów, was announced as the new head coach. In June 2009 Polish team played in Pool D of intercontinental round of the World League 2009. They won 5 of 12 matches, but lost all 4 matches with Brazil and 3 meetings with Finland. Poland took 11th place in general classification.

On 3 September 2009, Poland played its first match in preliminary round Pool A of the European Championship 2009 held in Turkey. Polish players beat France in opening match 3–1. Then won with Germany (3–1) and hosts – Turkey (3–0). Poland took first place in Pool A and went to play-off round, where in Pool F beat European Champion 2007 – Spain (3–2) and won two another meetings with Slovakia (3–2) and Greece (3–0). They reached the first place in the group and Poland advanced to the final round. In semi-final played against Bulgaria and won 3–0. In final they met with France once again. This two teams opened and closed European Championship 2009. On 13 September 2009 Poland won a title of the European Champion first time in history. 2 of 8 individual award were achieved by Polish players. Paweł Zagumny was the Best Setter and Most Valuable Player was awarded the captain and opposite hitter of Polish national team – Piotr Gruszka. On 14 September 2009 all players were awarded Knight's Cross of Polonia Restituta and coach Daniel Castellani received Officer's Cross of Polonia Restituta.

In 18–23 November 2009, Poland participated as the European Champion in World Grand Champions Cup held in Japan. The Polish team won 2 of 5 matches with Iran and Egypt. Poland took 4th place.

Polish men's national volleyball team was elected the best team of 2009 in 75th Plebiscyt Przeglądu Sportowego 2009 in Poland and Piotr Gruszka was 3rd in the Top 10 of Polish Athlets in the same competition.

2010

Polish national team started season with intercontinental round of the World League 2010. At the beginning they lost twice with German team (1–3 and 0–3) in Stuttgart. Then on 11–12 June beat hosts of final round – Argentina (3–1 and 3–2) in San Juan. On 18–19 June played with Cuba. Poland lost first match 2–3, but next day beat opponent 3–0. The remaining 6 matches Polish national team played in Poland. On 25–26 June, Poland beat Argentina (3–1 and 3–1) in Wrocław. They moved to Atlas Arena to Łódź, where they lost both matches with Cuba (0–3 and 1–3). Matches with Germany on 8–9 July ended Polish participated in the World League. Poland lost 2–3 and won the next day 3–1 at Spodek in Katowice.

On 25 September 2010, players of Polish national team played their first match at the World Championship 2010. They won all 3 matches in Pool F (first round) with Canada (3–0), Germany (3–2) and Serbia (3–1), which were held in Trieste, Italy. In second round Poland lost their both matches with Brazil (0–3) and Bulgaria (0–3). Poland ended Championships in place 13–18.

On 25 October 2010 after the vote of the board of Polish Volleyball Federation, Castellani was fired.

2011–2013 Andrea Anastasi

2011
After lacklustre previous year the head coach and a number of players were replaced. Andrea Anastasi began work as head coach on 23 February 2011, when Poland was ranked 11th in the FIVB ranking. His assistant was Andrea Gardini.

They started season without an important players like Zagumny, Winiarski or Wlazły. The team started with the World League 2011. Poland as host was in final tournament, which was held at Ergo Arena in Gdańsk. During a first match against Bulgaria, an opposite hitter – Zbigniew Bartman injured. Despite this Poland won after tie-break. Then Poland lost with Italy (0–3) and beat Argentina in five sets. They went to the semi-final, but lost the match against Russia (1–3). On 10 July 2011 Poland won first medal of the World League in history. Polish achieved individual awards – Bartosz Kurek was the Best Scorer and Krzysztof Ignaczak the Best Libero.

In the same year the Polish national team wanted to defend a title of European Champion from 2009. The team, without injured Zbigniew Bartman, won in playoff round with Czech Republic and went to quarterfinals. In Karlovy Vary beat Slovakia (3–0). Then they moved to Vienna and lost the match against Italy (0–3). Poles again played the 3rd place match. On 18 September 2011 they beat the winners of World League 2011 – Russia (3–1) and achieved their second bronze in 2011. In addition, individual award for Best Server received Bartosz Kurek.

In November was the first chance to qualify for the 2012 Summer Olympics. At FIVB World Cup 2011 won 9 of 11 matches. They lost with Iran (2–3), Brazil (2–3) and Russia (2–3). Polish national team won promotion to the Olympics on 3 December 2011, when they won first two sets against Brazil (this one point gave them place on the podium). In conclusion Poland won the silver medal, and repeated the success of the FIVB World Cup 1965, where Poland achieve silver too. For the first time in the history Polish national team won three medals in one year. One of individual awards received middle-blocker Marcin Możdżonek, who was Best Blocker.

Polish men's national volleyball team was elected the best team of 2011 in 77th Plebiscyt Przeglądu Sportowego 2011 in Poland and Bartosz Kurek was 2nd in the Top 10 of Polish Athlets in the same competition.

2012

The main purpose for the team were Olympics, but earlier they participated in FIVB World League 2012. They won 10 of 12 matches of intercontinental round, including 3 times won with Brazil, which was successful after many years of defeats. Poland advanced to Final Six, which was held in Sofia, Bulgaria. Polish team was in Pool F with Cuba and Brazil. They won both their group matches and went to the semi-final. They beat the host – Bulgaria and for the first time in history had a chance to play in final of World League. On 8 July 2012 won the final match against United States (3–0). It was a second medal of World League for Polish team and the first gold. Polish players received 4 of 8 individual awards. Best Spiker was Zbigniew Bartman, Best Blocker – Marcin Możdżonek, Best Libero – Krzysztof Ignaczak and Most Valuable Player – Bartosz Kurek.

On 29 July 2012 the team played their first Pool A match at the 20123 London Summer Olympics against Italy (3–1). Polish national team won 3 of 5 pool matches, but lost with Bulgaria and Australia. They went to quarterfinal, but lost it after 3–1 match against future Olympic Champions – Russia. Despite the defeat, Krzysztof Ignaczak was the Best Receiver of the 2012 Summer Olympics (four years earlier, the same award received another Polish player – Michał Winiarski).

Poland had the success and failure of this season, but despite this they were elected the best team of 2012 in 78th Plebiscyt Przeglądu Sportowego 2012 in Poland.

2013
The team started season on 24 May 2013 when they played friendly match with Serbia (3–0) in Milicz. Next day, on 25 May the two national teams played their second match in Twardogóra, which was won by guests (1–3).

Poland began its participation in the World League 2013 losing their first four matches. They lost twice with Brazil at Torwar Hall on 7 June (1–3) and after tie-brak at Atlas Arena on 9 June. Then Polish players lost next two aligned matches on 21 and 23 June against France, which have been resolved after tie-breaks. On 28 June 2013 Polish team played their first match with Argentine team (3–2) at Łuczniczka, Bydgoszcz and two days later their second meeting (3–1) at Ergo Arena in Gdańsk. The heroes of winning matches with Argentine players were Jarosz and Kurek. On 5 and 7 July, Polish national team beat United States team (3–2) at Spodek, Katowice and (3–1) at Centennial Hall in Wrocław, after great game of Jakub Jarosz. Poland didn't continue their series of victories. On 12 July 2013 lost (0–3) match against Bulgaria and one day later lost dramatic match after tie-break despite the determination of the whole team. Unstoppable was the main scorer of Bulgaria – Tsvetan Sokolov. At Palace of Culture and Sports, Varna lost their last two matches of intercontinental round and ended their game in World League 2013.

In October 2013 Andrea Anastasi was fired as coach of the Polish national team. The reason for this decision were unsuccessful Polish losses in 2013 and getting worse team game. Poland, while working of Andrea Anastasi, took 3rd place in the FIVB World Rankings. It was promotion from 11th place in early 2011. Anastasi has announced that he won't be coach of any national team at the World Championship 2014 held in Poland because of respect for his former players. He decided to stay in Poland and has been working with Polish club Lotos Trefl Gdańsk.

2014–2016 Stéphane Antiga

2014
On 24 October 2013, was announced new head coach Stéphane Antiga. He began his work after the end of the league season 2013/2014, because he played for PGE Skra Bełchatów and he had to complete his career as a player. His first tournament as Poland's head coach was the CEV European Championship 2015 qualification. Poland won 5 out of their 6 matches, beating Macedonia and Latvia twice each and Slovenia once. The Polish national team qualified for the CEV European Championship 2015.

After this, the team took part in the FIVB World League 2014. They won 6 of 12 matches in the intercontinental round, but didn't qualify for the Final Six. They lacked one set against Brazil for a place in the final tournament. The team went on to make preparations at training camps in Belchatów, Capbreton (France) and Spała before the World Championship 2014. On 16–18 August 2014 the 12th Memorial of Hubert Jerzy Wagner was held at Kraków Arena, Kraków. On the first day, after losing a match with Bulgaria (2–3), coach Antiga announced the list of players who would represent the Polish national team at the World Championship 2014. He eliminated one of the major players of previous years: Bartosz Kurek. In the following matches of tournament Mariusz Wlazły was unable to play because of a sprained ankle. Despite this, Poland defeated China and for the first time since 2011, beat Russia. The Polish team took 2nd place and two of the Polish players received individual awards: Piotr Nowakowski as Best Server and Krzysztof Ignaczak as Best Libero.

On 30 August 2014, Poland played their historic match at the National Stadium in Warsaw against Serbia as opening meeting of the 2014 World Championship. It was the opening match of the World Championship 2014 in Poland. Polish team won 3–0 and with attendance over 62,000 audience. In their first group, Pool A, Poland won all 5 matches and lost just one set with Cameroon. In their second group, Pool F, the host team won 3 of their 4 matches. On 10 September 2014, they lost to the United States (1–3), but then beat the national teams of Italy (3–1), Iran (3–2) and France (3–2). Poland took second place in Group F. The breakdown in the next stage of the tournament was decided by drawing lots. Poland went into group H with Brazil and Russia. Some commentators and fans called Pool H the "Group of Death", but it was a happy result for the home team. The Polish national team won two dramatic matches after tie-breaks at Atlas Arena in Łódź. On 16 September 2014 they beat Brazil. Poland's main scorer in the match was Mariusz Wlazły, who gained 31 points for his team. Two days later, Poland needed just two winning sets for promotion to the semi-final. Poland beat Russia and took first place in the group. On 21 September 2014 the Polish team won the semi-final match against Germany, which guaranteed for Poland their third ever medal at the World Championship. On 21 September 2014 Poland won the title of World Champion 2014, for the first time in 40 years. Poland beat Brazil (3–1). Polish players received 3 of 8 the individual awards in the tournament: Karol Kłos as Best Blocker, Mariusz Wlazły as Best Opposite and Most Valuable Player. After victory Poland have risen two places in FIVB ranking and has been taken 3rd place.

It was announced that in 2015, the Polish national team will take part in the World League, European Championship (Bulgaria/Italy), World Cup (Japan), and the first edition of the European Games, which will be held in Baku, Azerbaijan.

Historic result at World Championship brought the team their next title of the Best Team of 2014 in Plebiscite of Przegląd Sportowy 2014 in Poland. Head coach Stephane Antiga was awarded a title of the Coach of the year 2014 ex-aequo with Łukasz Kruczek. A title of Debutant of the year 2014 was awarded Mateusz Mika. Mariusz Wlazły was 2nd in the Top 10 of Polish Athlets in the same competition.

2015
Head coach Stephane Antiga appointed players to the Polish national team on 2 April 2015. The new chosen captain of the team was Karol Kłos, who replaced a previous one – Michał Winiarski. During the matches of intercontinental round of World League, the captain of Polish team was Michał Kubiak, because of Kłos' injury.

They began season with intercontinental round of World League 2015. First match with Russia, Poland won 3–0. Most Valuable Player of match was Mateusz Bieniek, who played his first match in senior national team. After break to national team returned a few players – Bartosz Kurek, Jakub Jarosz, Grzegorz Łomacz, Piotr Gacek, Wojciech Grzyb. Next day, Poland beat Russia in five-set match (3–2). Most Valuable Player of match was Bartosz Kurek (23 pts). On 5 June 2015 Poland beat Iran (3–1). Bartosz Kurek scored 30 pts and he was Most Valuable Player of match. Next day, Poland won another meeting with Iran (3–2) and MVP was chosen Michał Kubiak. On 12 June 2015 Poland lost first match with United States (3–2) after almost 3 hours meeting. It was first lost match of Poland since 10 September 2014, when they lost with U.S. national team at World Championship. Next day, Poland also lost with American players (3–1). After spending one week in United States, Poland moved to Russian ground – Kazan, where won two matches against Russia (3–1) and (3–2). Then they flew to Tehran. After a spectacular meeting, Poland lost first match on 26 June (3–2). Two days later, Polish national team beat Iran (3–1). Polish team spent three weeks in tour and they came back to Poland on last matches of intercontinental round with United States. On 3 July 2015 Poland beat USA in tie-break and achieved two points, which gave Polish team a qualification to final round of World League 2015 in Rio de Janeiro. Next day, they lost match (1–3). Poland qualified for the Pool J with Serbia and Italy. On 17 July Poland won match over Italy (3–1) and qualified to semi-final. Main leader in this important meeting was Michał Kubiak, who scored 19 pts. Next day, Serbia won over Poland (2–3), but Polish team gained 1 pt and took first place in Pool J. On 18 July, Poland lost semi-final with France (2–3). On 19 July Poland did not achieve bronze, because of lost with USA (0–3). Polish team had problems with own errors. Poland took 4th place in edition of the World League 2015. Polish players achieved two individual awards – Michał Kubiak was one of the Best Outside Spiker and Paweł Zatorski was Best Libero. In 2–9 August all players, whose were in final round in Rio de Janeiro went to training camp in Arłamów and two players joined to team (Włodarczyk, Kłos). Then the team without Wrona was training in Spała.

Polish national team is going to take part in 2015 Memorial of Hubert Jerzy Wagner in Toruń. First day, they beat Japan (3–0). In the following days Poland beat Iran (3–1) and France (3–2). Poland won 2015 Memorial of Hubert Jerzy Wagner for sixth time and Polish players achieved five individual awards – Best Spiker was Dawid Konarski, Best Server was Mateusz Bieniek, Best Blocker was Piotr Nowakowski, Best Libero was Paweł Zatorski and Most Valuable Player was a captain Michał Kubiak.

Polish players started their visit in Japan from training camp in Osaka and then they went to Hammamatsu, where they are playing their first round matches. Poland started a journey at World Cup 2015 on 8 September, when they beat Tunisia (3–0). In following day, Polish players beat Russia (3–1) and in both matches Most Valuable Player of match was chosen Bartosz Kurek. During third set of the meeting with Russia, Polish setter Grzegorz Łomacz twisted his ankle. On 10 September 2015 Poland contained their winning with Argentina (3–1) and MVP was Michał Kubiak. On 12 September, Polish team beat Iran (3–2) and best player on the court was chosen Mateusz Mika. On 13 September Poland played their last match in first round in Hamamatsu with Venezuela (3–1). MVP of match was Dawid Konarski, who scored 22 points. Poland won all five matches in first round of World Cup 2015, but lost one point in overall table. In second round Poland beat Canada (3–1), Egypt (3–0), and Australia (3–0). After eight victories without any defeat, Poland moved to Tokyo. On 21 September 2015, two previously undefeated teams met in first match of third round. Poland beat United States (3–1) and Polish captain Michał Kubiak played his best match in World Cup. Then Poland won match with host team Japan, but they had problems with them in first set (3–1). Poland won 10 of 10 matches and the last day on 23 September met with Italy. They lost 3–1 and they did not achieve one point so Poland took 3rd place in tournament, which did not give Poland a qualification to 2016 Summer Olympics. Poland won 10 of 11 matches, but because of points and ratio of set, achieved only bronze medal without Olympic qualification.

2016

From 5 to 10 January 2016, Polish team took part in 2016 Summer Olympics – European qualification. Poland was in Pool A, where they won two matches, with Serbia (3–1) and Belgium, lost one with Germany (2–3). In semi-final Poland lost with France (0–3) and lost chance to qualify to Olympics. On 10 January 2016 Poland won 3rd place match with Germany (3–2). Poland was qualified to World Olympic Qualification Tournament and keep chance to gain qualification to 2016 Summer Olympics.

On 28 May 2016, Poland started the battle in World Olympic Qualification Tournament. After 5 victories in first 5 matches (with Canada 3–2, France 3–2, Japan 3–0, China 3–2, Venezuela 3–0 and Iran 1–3) Poland achieved qualification to 2016 Rio Summer Olympics on 2 June 2016.

Poland beat 4 of 5 opponents in group stage at 2016 Summer Olympics (lost only to Russia after tie break). They took second place in Groub B and were qualified to quarterfinals. In due of draw, Poland met in next stage of Olympics with USA. On 17 August 2016 Americans beat Polish players (0–3) and Poland took 5th place – fourth Olympics with the same result in a row.

2017: Ferdinando De Giorgi

The contract of Stephane Antiga lasted to the end of December 2016, and the Federation decided not to renew it. In October 2016, Polish Volleyball Federation decided to choose a new head coach of Poland. There were three main candidates: Radostin Stoychev, Mauro Berruto and Ferdinando De Giorgi. On 16 December 2016, it was announced that Ferdinando De Giorgi took over the Polish team.

2017
De Giorgi made his debut as a head coach of Poland in friendly match with Iran without losing any set, on 20 May 2017. The match was a goodbye match for notable libero Krzysztof Ignaczak, who officially ended up his career in national team. Then Poland took part in intercontinental round of the 2017 FIVB World League. In first week, Poland beat Brazil (3–2) and Italy (3–1), but lost match with Iran (1–3). Overall, Poland won 4 and lost 5 meetings. They lost a chance to advance to Final Six after losing match with United States (1–3) on 18 June. In final standing Poland took 8th place.

Poland took part in annual friendly tournament 2017 Memorial of Hubert Jerzy Wagner in 11–13 August 2017. On day 1, they lost with France (2–3) and next day they beat Canada led by their previous head coach Stephane Antiga (3–0). These two matches were played by main players of team without any relevant changes in squad. In last match with Russia, coach De Giorgi decided to check extended squad and young players. Poland easily lost first two sets and made a contact in third set. Poland won after tie-break and achieved 7th win of the Memorial of Hubert Jerzy Wagner. The victory was provided mainly by some newbies in senior national team Łukasz Kaczmarek, Jakub Kochanowski, Bartłomiej Lemański and also by few young players, who debuted in previous year like Artur Szalpuk. Head coach De Giorgi had an intention to announce team roster for upcoming 2017 European Championship, but after match with Russia he changed his mind and said he is going to do it few days later.

Poland took part in the 2017 European Championships. The national team opened Championships with loss at National Stadium, Warsaw in front of more than 60.000 fans (with Serbia). Then they won twice (3–0) with Finland and Estonia. On 30 August 2017 Polish national team was beaten by Slovenia in playoffs. The atmosphere in the team was not the best and the head coach failed to draw conclusions from the defeat, so PZPS fired Ferdinando De Giorgi on 20 September.

2018–2021: Vital Heynen

PZPS chose a new head coach out of three candidates: Piotr Gruszka, Andrzej Kowal and Vital Heynen. On 7 February 2018 Heynen was chosen in explicit voting. Heynen has also agreed to the condition that the PZPS can dismiss him at the end of any season without paying any compensation.

2022–present: Nikola Grbić

Statistics

Olympic Games
 Champions   Second place   Third place

World Championship
 Champions   Second place   Third place

World Cup
 Champions   Second place   Third place

World Grand Champions Cup
 Champions   Second place   Third place

World League
 Champions   Second place   Third place

Nations League
 Champions   Second place   Third place

European Championship
 Champions   Second place   Third place

European League
 2014 – 6th place
 2015 –  Bronze medal

European Games
 2015 Baku — 4th place

Summer Universiade
 2013 Kazan –  Silver medal
 2019 Naples –  Silver medal

Hubert Jerzy Wagner Memorial
 2003 Olsztyn –  Silver medal
 2004 Olsztyn –  Silver medal 
 2005 Olsztyn/Iława –  Silver medal
 2006 Ostróda/Iława/Olsztyn –  Gold medal
 2007 Olsztyn/Elbląg/Ostróda –  Bronze medal
 2008 Olsztyn –  Gold medal
 2009 Łódź –  Gold medal
 2010 Bydgoszcz –  Bronze medal
 2011 Katowice – 4th place
 2012 Zielona Góra –  Gold medal
 2013 Płock –  Gold medal
 2014 Kraków –  Silver medal
 2015 Toruń –  Gold medal
 2016 Kraków –  Bronze medal
 2017 Kraków –  Gold medal
 2018 Kraków –  Gold medal
 2019 Kraków –  Silver medal
 2021 Kraków –  Gold medal
 2022 Kraków –  Gold medal

Team

Current squad
Representing Poland in the 2022 World Championship (updated on 10 August 2022).

Head coach: Nikola Grbić
Captain: Bartosz Kurek

Head coaches

Individual awards for players

Gallery
 2011 FIVB World League

 2012 FIVB World League

 2013 FIVB World League

Media
When Łukasz Kadziewicz was a member of the Polish national team he created the Kadziu Project. He filmed videos that showed how the Polish team was preparing for matches and their lifestyle during tournaments (for example the Olympics in Beijing, 2008). When Kadziewicz ended his career in the national team, Krzysztof Ignaczak took up his idea and he was continuing this work under the name Igłą Szyte. Ignaczak has made videos and has written a blog.

On 8 August 2014 held the official premiere of a documentary film about the Polish men's volleyball national team – Drużyna. In the video players was talking about national team, motivation, daily life of representation. Cameras accompanied the team leading by Andrea Anastasi in 2013. The movie shows the season from the start of the preparation in Spała to the end of the 2013 CEV European Championship. The film ends with the takeover the team by the new national team coach – Stephane Antiga.

Kit providers
The table below shows the history of kit providers for the Poland national volleyball team.

Sponsorship
Primary sponsors include: main sponsors like PKN Orlen and Plus, other sponsors: Adidas, Okocim Brewery, Deloitte, Kinder +Sport, Dynamic Parcel Distribution, Jurajska and SMJ sport.

See also

Poland men's national U19 volleyball team
Poland men's national U21 volleyball team
Poland men's national U23 volleyball team

References

External links

 Official website 
 CEV profile
 FIVB profile

National men's volleyball teams
National team
National team
World champion national volleyball teams